Pselactus is a genus of beetles belonging to the family Curculionidae.

The species of this genus are found in Europe, Northwestern Africa and Northern America.

Species:
 Pselactus affinis (Wollaston, 1861) 
 Pselactus apionoides Horn, 1873

References

Curculionidae
Curculionidae genera